Miltochrista simplicior is a moth of the subfamily Arctiinae. It was described by Shōnen Matsumura in 1927. It is found in Taiwan.

References

simplicior
Moths described in 1927
Moths of Asia